Richard Venables (1775-1858) was Archdeacon of Carmarthen from 1832 until his death.

He was born in London, educated at Clare College, Cambridge and ordained in 1798. He held incumbencies at Warmsfield, Ackwicken with Leziate, Clyro, Llansantffraed and Newchurch.

He died on 15 January 1858.

References

1775 births
1858 deaths
Alumni of Clare College, Cambridge
19th-century English Anglican priests
Archdeacons of Carmarthen